Henderson may refer to:

People
Henderson (surname), description of the surname, and a list of people with the surname
Clan Henderson, a Scottish clan

Places

Argentina
Henderson, Buenos Aires

Australia
Henderson, Western Australia

Canada
Henderson Settlement, New Brunswick

New Zealand
Henderson, New Zealand
Henderson (New Zealand electorate), former parliamentary electorate

United States
Henderson, Colorado
Henderson, Georgia
Henderson, Houston County, Georgia
Henderson, Illinois
Henderson, Indiana
Henderson, Iowa
Henderson, Kentucky
Henderson, Louisiana
Henderson, Maryland
Henderson, Michigan
Henderson, Minnesota
Henderson, Missouri
Henderson, Nebraska
Henderson, Nevada
Henderson, New York, a town
Henderson (CDP), New York, a hamlet in the town
Henderson, North Carolina
Henderson, Tennessee
Henderson, Texas
Henderson, West Virginia
Henderson County (disambiguation)
Henderson Township (disambiguation)

Geographic features
 Henderson (crater), on the far side of the moon
 Henderson Inlet, a small estuary in Olympia, Washington, United States
 Henderson Island (Pitcairn Islands), South Pacific Ocean
 Henderson Island (Shackleton Ice Shelf), Antarctica
 Henderson Islets, Tasmania, south-eastern Australia

Companies
Henderson Land Development, a Hong Kong real estate developer
Henderson China, a Chinese real estate developer
D. and W. Henderson and Company, a former Scottish shipbuilding company
Henderson's, a former UK bookstore
Henderson's, manufacturers of Henderson's Relish
Henderson Group, a UK financial services company
Henderson Motorcycle, a historical US maker of motorcycles

Constructs

Airports
Henderson Executive Airport, Clark County, Nevada, United States
Henderson Field (Guadalcanal), Solomon Islands
Henderson Field (Midway Atoll), United States
Henderson Field (North Carolina), Wallace, North Carolina, United States

Churches
Henderson Church in Kilmarnock, Scotland

Schools
Henderson Avenue Public School, Thornhill, Ontario, Canada, Canada
Henderson Elementary School, Vancouver, British Columbia
Henderson Secondary School, Singapore
Henderson County High School, Henderson, Kentucky, United States
Henderson High School (disambiguation)
Henderson Middle School (disambiguation)

University
Henderson State University, Arkadelphia, Arkansas, United States

In popular culture 
 Fictional town in which the soap opera Search for Tomorrow is set

See also
Hendersonville (disambiguation)
Justice Henderson (disambiguation)